Jerry Joseph Casale (September 27, 1933 – February 9, 2019) was a starting pitcher in Major League Baseball who played for three teams between 1958 and 1962.

Early life 
Casale was originally signed by the Boston Red Sox as an amateur free agent before the 1952 season, receiving a signing bonus of $30,000. He was one of nine spring training recruits of the San Jose Red Sox who had received signing bonuses, which earned the team the nickname "Gold Sox". Of those nine players, only Casale, Marty Keough, and Jerry Zimmerman made it to the major leagues.

Casale in the minor leagues once hit a 560-foot home run while with the San Francisco Seals.

Casale reached the majors in 1958 (he spent two years in the military). He was with the Red Sox for three years.  In his first game as a starter he pitched against the Washington Senators and the Red Sox won 7–3. Casale struck out eight and also hit a three-run home run.

He was with the Red Sox for three years before moving to the Los Angeles Angels (1961) and then was traded to the Detroit Tigers (1961–1962) for Jim Donohue. While with the Angels he gave up the first home run for then Red Sox rookie Carl Yastrzemski. 
 
His most productive season in the major leagues came in 1959 with Boston, when he recorded career-highs in wins (13), strikeouts (93), earned run average (ERA) (4.31), complete games (9), innings pitched (179), and collected two three-hit shutouts against the Chicago White Sox and Cleveland Indians. His .619 win–loss percentage ranked him 10th in the American League.

In a five-season career, Casale posted a 17–24 record with 207 strikeouts in 370 innings. He also helped himself with the bat, hitting .216 (25-for-116) with four home runs and 15 runs batted in.

After baseball Casale went into the restaurant business. He opened a restaurant in Manhattan called Murray's with former New York Mets players Art Shamsky and Ron Darling, and later opened an Italian restaurant called Pino's on 34th Street in the Murray Hill section of Manhattan.

Casale lived for a time in Staten Island and resided in Secaucus, New Jersey.

Casale died on February 9, 2019, at age 85.

References

External links

 Retrosheet
 Bat for the Cure

1933 births
2019 deaths
Albany Senators players
American people of Italian descent
Boston Red Sox players
Buffalo Bisons (minor league) players
Detroit Tigers players
Denver Bears players
Greensboro Patriots players
Los Angeles Angels players
Louisville Colonels (minor league) players
Major League Baseball pitchers
People from Secaucus, New Jersey
Sportspeople from Staten Island
Baseball players from New York City
Roanoke Ro-Sox players
San Francisco Seals (baseball) players
San Jose Red Sox players
Sportspeople from Brooklyn